The 1977–78 British Home Championship football competition between the British Home Nations was won by an England side smarting from their failure to qualify for the 1978 FIFA World Cup. Scotland again refused to travel to Northern Ireland and therefore gained an additional home match. The Scots, who had qualified for the World Cup and of whom much was expected following impressive form and a strong team in the months going into the finals performed particularly poorly in the Home Championship, foreshadowing their performance in Argentina a few months later. The English capitalised on a heavy victory over the Welsh in their first match and then won in their next two beating an already demoralised Scotland who had only managed to draw with the Welsh and Irish. The Welsh improved following their initial loss, beating the Irish and holding the Scots to a 1–1 draw in Glasgow to claim second place.

Table

Results

References

External links
Full Results and Line-ups

1978
1978 in British sport
1977–78 in Northern Ireland association football
1977–78 in Welsh football
1977–78 in English football
1977–78 in Scottish football